Tanquián de Escobedo is a town and municipality in San Luis Potosí in central Mexico.

Demographics 
Tanquián de Ecosbedo's population has a population of 14,382, 83% of them which are Catholic. 25% of the population is indigenous or is of indigenous descent. Its most populous town of the same name, has a population of 9458 according to the 2020 mexican census.

References

Municipalities of San Luis Potosí